Ruff is an unincorporated community in Mathews County, in the U. S. state of Virginia.

References

Unincorporated communities in Virginia
Unincorporated communities in Mathews County, Virginia